The 2023 NRL pre-season will be played between the 4th and 19th February 2023, before a 11-day lead up until the beginning of the 2023 NRL season.

Background
The 2023 pre-season saw the introduction of the inaugural Pre-season Challenge, with bonus points rewarding teams for scoring tries, making line breaks and offloading. Rotorua hosted the All Stars match, which was the first time the match was played in New Zealand. 

The season marked the return of the World Club Challenge, between reigning NRL premiers Penrith Panthers and 2022 Super League winners St Helens. It was the first edition of the match since 2019 due to the COVID-19 pandemic.

Standings
The winner of the Pre-season Challenge would receive $100,000 AUD. Only matches in the second and third week of the pre-season counted towards the standings, excluding the All Stars match.

Twelve competition points are awarded for a win and six for a draw. One bonus competition point is awarded for each of the following: 5 or more tries, 5 or more line breaks, and 10 or more offloads.

Notes:

Fixtures

First week

Second week

Third week

See also 

 2023 NRL season
 2023 NRL season results

References 

2023 NRL season